Dirk Anders (born 26 September 1966) is a German former professional footballer who played as a midfielder. Anders began playing football for the youth teams of football club BFC Dynamo. He made his debut for the first team of BFC Dynamo in the DDR-Oberliga at home against FC Karl-Marx-Stadt in the last matchday of the 1986-87 DDR-Oberliga on 6 June 1987. He currently works as a scout for Bayern Munich.

References

External links

1966 births
Living people
German footballers
East German footballers
Association football midfielders
DDR-Oberliga players
Bundesliga players
2. Bundesliga players
Berliner FC Dynamo players
1. FC Lokomotive Leipzig players
1. FC Kaiserslautern players
MSV Duisburg players
SpVgg Greuther Fürth players
VfR Mannheim players
SK Vorwärts Steyr players
Chemnitzer FC players
German football managers
Wormatia Worms managers
FC Bayern Munich non-playing staff
People from East Berlin
Footballers from Berlin